Brown Island is a small, private island in Friday Harbor on San Juan Island, San Juan County, Washington, United States. It lies just offshore to the east-northeast of the town of Friday Harbor, Washington.

Brown Island was named by the Wilkes Expedition in 1841 for the party's navigational instrument repairman, John G. Brown.

See also

References

Brown Island: Blocks 1024 and 1025, Census Tract 9604, San Juan County, Washington United States Census Bureau

San Juan Islands
Private islands of Washington (state)